Soldierwood is a common name for several plants and may refer to:

Calliandra purpurea, native to the Lesser Antilles and northern South America
Colubrina elliptica, native to Florida, the Caribbean, Central America, and northern South America